This is a list of seasons completed by the Harrisburg Senators of the Eastern League. This list documents the records and playoff results for all seasons the Senators have completed since their first inception in 1924 through 1935, and their second inception since 1987.

Original Senators (1924–1935)

Modern-day Senators (1987–present)

- in GB is behind, + in GB is ahead
Bold years are Eastern League Championship years

Eastern League teams seasons
seasons
Harrisburg Senators seasons